United States v Thailand was the first game to be played in Group F of the group stage of the 2019 FIFA Women's World Cup. The game  was played in Stade Auguste-Delaune in Reims, France on June 11, 2019 between the women's national football (soccer) teams of the United States and Thailand. The United States won the match 13–0, recording the biggest ever victory in the finals of the FIFA Women's World Cup history.

Alex Morgan scored five times, tying a tournament and team record set by Michelle Akers for most goals scored by a player in a single World Cup match, while four of her teammates scored their first World Cup goals in their debut at the tournament.

Background
Thailand has qualified for their second consecutive World Cup, having debuted in the 2015 FIFA Women's World Cup. The core of the 2019 Thailand squad was retained for the 2019 tournament with Miranda Nild, a noted addition to the squad. Nuengrutai Srathongvian has led Thailand as its head coach for both the 2015 and 2019 editions. The team was also backed by billionaire Nualphan Lamsam as its team manager and sponsor.

Thailand was drawn in a difficult group. The other teams aside from the United States were Sweden and Chile. United States were the defending champions entering the tournament.

The two nations, prior to this encounter, only met once: a 2016 friendly in Columbus, Ohio, in which Thailand lost 9-0 to the United States.

Match

Detail

Aftermath
The U.S. team was immediately criticized for celebrating their later goals during the match, with media commentators and former players calling it disrespectful. The celebrations were defended by other commentators, the team's players, and members of the opposing Thai bench.

Thai goalkeeper Sukanya Chor Charoenying was disappointed with the result who thanked American forward Carli Lloyd for consoling her shortly after the match. Thai team manager Nualphan Lamsam apologized for the result but vowed to "fight to the fullest in the two remaining matches with the spirit of sportsmanship".

The former Canada international player Kaylyn Kyle received death threats for criticizing the U.S. team's behavior on television after the game.

The United States went on to advance to the next round by topping their group, while Thailand was unable to secure a single point.

2019 FIFA Women's World Cup – Group F

See also
Hungary v El Salvador (1982 FIFA World Cup), the biggest victory in men's FIFA World Cup

References

2019 FIFA Women's World Cup
FIFA Women's World Cup matches
United States women's national soccer team matches
United States at the 2019 FIFA Women's World Cup
Thailand at the 2019 FIFA Women's World Cup
Record association football wins
Sport in Reims
June 2019 sports events in Europe